Alessio Miceli (born 30 August 1999) is an Italian professional footballer who plays as a midfielder for Eerste Divisie club Dordrecht.

Professional career
Miceli is a product of the S.S. Lazio Youth Sector, and played in several different positions at youth level, from attacking midfielder to centre-back. 10 years after first joining their academy, Miceli made his professional debut for Lazio in a 2017–18 UEFA Europa League group stage 1–1 tie with SBV Vitesse on 23 November 2017.

On 2 September 2019, he joined Olbia on loan with an option to purchase.

On 3 September 2020 he signed with Piacenza.

On 9 July 2021, he moved to Dutch club Dordrecht. He made his debut for the club on 6 August in a 1–1 draw in the Eerste Divisie against Jong PSV.

References

External links
 
 
 
 Serie A Profile

1999 births
Living people
Footballers from Rome
Italian footballers
Association football midfielders
S.S. Lazio players
FeralpiSalò players
Olbia Calcio 1905 players
Piacenza Calcio 1919 players
FC Dordrecht players
Serie C players
Italian expatriate footballers
Expatriate footballers in the Netherlands
Italian expatriate sportspeople in the Netherlands
Eerste Divisie players